Year 1445 (MCDXLV) was a common year starting on Friday (link will display the full calendar) of the Julian calendar.

Events 
 January–December 
 October 10 – Battle of Mokra: The Albanian forces under Skanderbeg defeat the Ottoman forces (Pope Eugene IV raises a hymn of praise, that Christendom has been provided with a new defender, after he hears of the battle).

 Date unknown 
 The Portuguese set up their first trading post (Feitoria) in Africa, on the island of Arguin.
 Portuguese explorer Dinis Dias discovers the Cap-Vert, on the western coast of Africa.
 Battle of Gomit: Emperor Zara Yaqob of Ethiopia defeats and kills Sultan Arwe Badlay, of Adal.
 Vlad II Dracul, aided by a crusaders' fleet from Burgundy, attacks Giurgiu, and massacres the Ottoman garrison after their surrender.
 Stephen II remains sole ruler of Moldavia.

Births 
 March 16 – Johann Geiler von Kaisersberg, Swiss-born priest (d. 1510)
 April 4 – Wiguleus Fröschl of Marzoll, Bishop of Passau (1500–1517) (d. 1517)
 October 25 – Fulk Bourchier, 10th Baron FitzWarin, English baron (d. 1479)
 October 31 – Hedwig, Abbess of Quedlinburg, Princess-Abbess of Quedlinburg (d. 1511)
 December 11 – Eberhard I, Duke of Württemberg (d. 1496)
 date unknown – Albert Brudzewski, Polish astronomer (d. 1497)
 probable – Nicolas Chuquet, French mathematician
 approximate – Sandro Botticelli, Italian painter (d. 1510)

Deaths 
 January 19 – Antonio Correr, Spanish cardinal (b. 1359)
 February 19 – Leonor of Aragon, queen of Portugal (b. 1402)
 April 7 – Louis VIII, Duke of Bavaria, German noble (b. 1403)
 May 15 – Johanna van Polanen, Dutch noblewoman (b. 1392)
 June 5 – Leonel Power, English composer
 July 15 – Joan Beaufort, Queen of Scotland
 August 2 – Oswald von Wolkenstein, Austrian composer (b. 1377)
 date unknown – Olug Moxammat of Kazan, Khan of Kazan

References